The 1970–71 Phoenix Suns season was the third season for the Phoenix Suns of the National Basketball Association. Head coach Cotton Fitzsimmons lead the Suns, in the NBA's first season which separated the teams into both  conferences and divisions as the league continued to gain more teams. It was the first season the Suns would be without the services of All-Star guard Gail Goodrich. With a 48–34 record (fourth best in the league), the Suns set the NBA record for the team with the best winning percentage not to make the playoffs. The team would break their own record the next year with a 49–33 finish. All home games were played at Arizona Veterans Memorial Coliseum.

The Suns were led in scoring by Dick Van Arsdale with 21.9 points per game. Connie Hawkins finished the season averaging 20.9 points and 9.1 rebounds per contest. Paul Silas led the Suns with 12.5 rebounds per game, the highest-ever average in Suns history, while Neal Walk garnered 8.2 rebounds to go with his 12.9 points a game.

Goodrich, a native of Los Angeles and who played college ball at UCLA, was traded before the season back to the Los Angeles Lakers, where he had played before being acquired in the expansion draft of 1968. In exchange, the Suns obtained the 29-year-old 7-footer Mel Counts, who was coming off a career-high 12.6 average in points. Goodrich would go on to play nine more seasons in the NBA, six of those with the Lakers. During those six years, he would average 22.3 points per game, appear in four All-Star Games and be named to an All-NBA First Team. Meanwhile, Counts averaged 11 points and 6.3 rebounds in his first of two seasons with the Suns.

Offseason

NBA Draft

Roster
{| class="toccolours" style="font-size: 85%; width: 100%;"
|-
! colspan="2" style="background-color: #423189;  color: #FF8800; text-align: center;" | Phoenix Suns roster
|- style="background-color: #FF8800; color: #423189;   text-align: center;"
! Players !! Coaches
|-
| valign="top" |

References
 Standings on Basketball Reference

Phoenix
Phoenix Suns seasons